McKee's Camp railway station is a flag stop for Via Rail's transcontinental The Canadian train service at McKee's Camp, a hunting fishing and tourist camp in Capreol, Ontario, Canada.

References

External links
 Mc Kee's Camp railway station
 McKee's Camp official website

Via Rail stations in Ontario
Railway stations in Greater Sudbury
Canadian National Railway stations in Ontario